Laurent Cabasso (born 25 August 1961) is a French contemporary classical pianist.

Biography 
Laurent Cabasso studied at the conservatoire de Paris. In 1982 he obtained the third prize at the Concours Géza Anda in Zurich.

He is a teacher at the conservatoire de Strasbourg and assistant professor at the CNSMDP.

Discography 
 2011 - Beethoven: Diabelli Variations ; Schubert: Wanderer Fantasy, Variation on a valz by Diabelli (Naïve Records)
 Schumann: Choc du Monde de la musique, Télérama
 Prokofiev: Grand prix du disque de l’Académie du disque français
 Shostakovich/Prokofiev with Sonia Wieder-Atherton: Joker of Crescendo
 Beethoven: selected in Le Monde among the best records of the year
 Diapason d’or for his recording dedicated to Liszt with organist Olivier Vernet.

His latest recording of Beethoven's "Diabelli Variations" and Schubert's "Wanderer-Fantasy", which appeared at the end of 2011 at Naïve records, was unanimously hailed by the press. The record was selected  by France Musique and Télérama where Gilles Macassar wrote: "His recording imposes itself from the start with such a strong evidence, such an impression of "that's it", that one is certain to hold an interpretation that will be a landmark. A reference version? Better: a commitment sovereignly personal, both fully free and scrupulously exact!".

External links 
  (discography)
 Laurent Cabasso on Pianobleu.com
 Laurent Cabasso Chopin: Scherzo n°1 en si mineur op. 20 on YouTube
 Laurent Cabasso on France Musique
 Laurent Cabasso on cnsmd-lyon
 Laurent Cabasso on Je joue du piano
 Laurent Cabasso on hexagone.net/music

1961 births
Living people
21st-century French male classical pianists
Conservatoire de Paris alumni
French music educators